Mya de Freitas (born 16 September 2005) is a Vincentian swimmer. She competed in the 2020 Summer Olympics.

References

2005 births
Living people
Swimmers at the 2020 Summer Olympics
Saint Vincent and the Grenadines female swimmers
Olympic swimmers of Saint Vincent and the Grenadines
Pan American Games competitors for Saint Vincent and the Grenadines
Swimmers at the 2019 Pan American Games